Baileyville may refer to:

Baileyville, Illinois
Baileyville, Kansas
Baileyville, Maine